Anton Šoltýs (30 April 1937 – 12 December 2022) was a Slovak alpine skier. He competed in two events at the 1964 Winter Olympics.

Šoltýs died on 12 December 2022, at the age of 85.

References

External links
 

1937 births
2022 deaths
Slovak male alpine skiers
Olympic alpine skiers of Czechoslovakia
Alpine skiers at the 1964 Winter Olympics
People from Kežmarok
Sportspeople from the Prešov Region